Dazhuangke Township is a township located inside of Yanqing District, Beijing, China. It shares border with Yongning Town in its north, Jiuduhe and Yanshou Towns in its east, Shisanling Town in its south, and Jingzhuang Town in its west. In the 2020, the township was home to 4,202 inhabitants.

Originally this region was known as Dazhuangke. But due to the rarity and writing difficulty of the last character 窠, it was later swapped for 科.

Geography 
Dazhuangke Township is located entirely within a mountainous area, with parts of the Yan Mountain Range dominating its northern portion. Changchi Road and Datong–Qinhuangdao railway pass through this region.

History

Administrative divisions 
By the end of 2021, Dazhuangke Township had 30 subdivisions within its borders, of which 1 was a community and 29 were villages. They are listed as follows:

See also 
 List of township-level divisions of Beijing

References

Yanqing District
Township-level divisions of Beijing